Qaleh Now-e Khaleseh (also Romanized as Qal‘eh Now-e Khāleşeh) is a village in Howmeh Rural District, in the Central District of Shahrud County, Semnan Province, Iran. At the 2006 census, its population was 267, in 77 families.

References 

Populated places in Shahrud County